Ray Anderson (born October 16, 1952) is an American jazz trombonist. Trained by the Chicago Symphony trombonists, he is regarded as someone who pushes the limits of the instrument, including performing on alto trombone and slide trumpet. He is a colleague of trombonist George E. Lewis. Anderson also plays sousaphone and sings. He was frequently chosen in DownBeat magazine's Critics Poll as best trombonist throughout the late 1980s and early 1990s.

Biography
After studying in California, he moved to New York in 1972 and freelanced. In 1977, he joined Anthony Braxton's Quartet (replacing George E. Lewis) and started working with Barry Altschul's group. In addition to leading his own groups since the late 1970s (including the funk-oriented Slickaphonics), Anderson has worked with George Gruntz's Concert Jazz Band. In the 1990s, he began taking an occasional good-humored vocal, during which he shows the ability to sing two notes at the same time (a minor third apart).

Anderson has worked with David Murray, Charlie Haden's Liberation Music Orchestra, Dr. John, Luther Allison, Bennie Wallace, Gerry Hemingway, Henry Threadgill, John Scofield, Roscoe Mitchell, Randy Sandke's Inside Out Band, Sam Rivers' Rivbea Orchestra, Bobby Previte, George Russell and others. Anderson is a member of Jim Pugh's Super Trombone with Dave Bargeron and Dave Taylor. He received a grant from the National Endowment for the Arts for a series of solo trombone concerts.

Anderson has frequently returned to his early love of New Orleans music for inspiration. His Alligatory Band and Pocket Brass Band, featuring tuba player Bob Stewart or sousaphonist Matt Perrine and trumpeter Lew Soloff, are rooted in its tradition. Since 2003 he has taught and conducted at Stony Brook University.

Discography

As leader/co-leader
 Harrisburg Half Life (Moers, 1980)
 Right Down Your Alley (Soul Note, 1984)
 Old Bottles - New Wine (Enja, 1985)
 It Just So Happens (Enja, 1987)
 Blues Bred in the Bone (Enja, 1988)
 What Because (Gramavision, 1989)
 Wishbone (Gramavision, 1991)
 Every One of Us (Gramavision, 1992)
 Big Band Record (Gramavision, 1994)
 Azurety (hat ART, 1994) with Han Bennink and Christy Doran
 Don't Mow Your Lawn (Enja, 1994) with the Alligatory Band
 Slideride (hat ART, 1994) with Craig Harris, George E. Lewis and Gary Valente
 Cheer Up (hat Art, 1995) with Han Bennink and Christy Doran
 Where Home Is (Enja, 1998)
 Bonemeal (Raybone, 2000)
 Bobby Previte & Bump, Just Add Water (Palmetto, 2001)
 Ray Anderson/Ibrahim Electric, Ibrahim Electric Meets Ray Anderson (Sundance, 2005)
 Sweet Chicago Suite (2012)

With BassDrumBone
 Wooferlo (Soul Note, 1989)
 Hence The Reason (Enja, 1997)
 Cooked To Perfection (Auricle, 1999)
 March Of Dimes (Data, 2002)
 The Line Up (Clean Feed Records, 2006)
 The Other Parade (Clean Feed Records, 2011)
 The Long Road (Auricle, 2016)

With Slickaphonics
 Wow Bag (Enja, 1982)
 Modern Life (Enja, 1984)
 Humatomic Energy (Blue Heron Records, 1985)
 Check Your Head at the Door (Teldec, 1986)
 Live (Teldec, 1987)

As sideman
 Live in an American Time Spiral, George Russell's New York Band (Soul Note, 1983)

With Barry Altschul
 Somewhere Else (Moers, 1979)

With Anthony Braxton
 Creative Orchestra (Köln) 1978 (hatART, 1978 [1995])
 Performance (Quartet) 1979 (hatART, 1979 [1981])
 Seven Compositions 1978 (Moers Music, 1979)
 Composition No. 94 for Three Instrumentalists (1980) (Golden Years of Jazz, 1980 [1999])
 Composition 98 (hatART, 1981)
With Charlie Haden
 The Montreal Tapes: Liberation Music Orchestra (Verve, 1989 [1999])
 Dream Keeper (DownBeat's Jazz album of the year)
With Roscoe Mitchell
Sketches from Bamboo (Moers Music, 1979)
With Sam Rivers' Rivbea All-star Orchestra
Culmination (BMG France, 1999)
With Hank Roberts
 Black Pastels (JMT, 1988)
With Bob Thiele Collective
 Lion Hearted (1993)
With Roseanna Vitro and Kenny Werner
 The Delirium Blues Project: Serve or Suffer (2008)

References

External links
Ray Anderson's official site 

1952 births
Living people
American jazz trombonists
Male trombonists
Jazz musicians from Illinois
Musicians from Chicago
Free jazz trombonists
CIMP artists
Enja Records artists
Stony Brook University faculty
University of Chicago Laboratory Schools alumni
21st-century trombonists
21st-century American male musicians
American male jazz musicians
Clean Feed Records artists
Palmetto Records artists
Black Saint/Soul Note artists
Moers Music artists
Gramavision Records artists